In the mathematical field of numerical analysis, discrete spline interpolation is a form of interpolation where the interpolant is a special type of piecewise polynomial called a discrete spline. A discrete spline is a piecewise polynomial such that its central differences are continuous at the knots whereas a spline is a piecewise polynomial such that its derivatives are continuous at the knots. Discrete cubic splines are discrete splines where the central differences of orders 0, 1, and 2 are required to be continuous.

Discrete splines were introduced by Mangasarin and Schumaker in 1971 as solutions of certain minimization problems involving differences.

Discrete cubic splines
Let x1, x2, . . ., xn-1 be an increasing sequence of real numbers. Let g(x) be a piecewise polynomial defined by

where g1(x), . . ., gn(x) are polynomials of degree 3. Let h > 0. If

then g(x) is called a discrete cubic spline.

Alternative formulation 1
The conditions defining a discrete cubic spline are equivalent to the following:

Alternative formulation 2
The central differences of orders 0, 1, and 2 of a function f(x) are defined as follows:

The conditions defining a discrete cubic spline are also equivalent to

This states that the central differences  are continuous at xi.

Example
Let x1 = 1 and x2 = 2 so that n = 3. The following function defines a discrete cubic spline:

Discrete cubic spline interpolant

Let x0 < x1 and xn > xn-1 and f(x) be a function defined in the closed interval [x0 - h, xn + h]. Then there is a unique cubic discrete spline g(x) satisfying the following conditions:

This  unique discrete cubic spline is the discrete spline interpolant to f(x) in the interval [x0 - h, xn + h]. This interpolant agrees with the values of f(x) at x0, x1, . . ., xn.

Applications
 Discrete cubic splines were originally introduced as solutions of certain minimization problems.
 They have applications in computing nonlinear splines.
 They are used to obtain approximate solution of a second order boundary value problem.
 Discrete interpolatory splines have been used to construct biorthogonal wavelets.

References

Interpolation
Splines (mathematics)